The Roman Catholic Diocese of Vic  is a diocese with its seat in the city of Vic in the ecclesiastical province of Tarragona in Catalonia, Spain. Its cathedral is a basilica dedicated to Saint Peter.

History
A diocese was first established at Vic in the fifth century. After the Islamic conquest of Spain in 711, the diocese was abandoned.

The diocese was re-established in 886, shortly after the official re-settlement of the Plain of Vic had begun in 878. According to one theory, the new diocese was a product of the initiative of the Sunyer II, count of Empúries, and Teuter, bishop of Girona, to spread their influence westward at the expense of Count Wifred I of Osona. It is more likely that the see was re-founded with the support of Wifred, who petitioned the archdiocese of Narbonne to accept it as a suffragan. Although Vic was the traditional capital of the County of Osona, the county and the bishopric were not coterminous. The monastery of Santa Maria de Ripoll, one of the most important in the diocese, lay within the County of Besalú. So long as the counts of Osona were also counts of Barcelona, they appointed viscounts to rule in Osona, and these usually resided at the castle of Cardona in the diocese of Urgell. As a result, the bishops of Vic came to control the city itself, blending public, private and ecclesiastical power there.

There is a surviving charter of King Odo dated 889, in which the king appears to grant the count of Osona to the bishop, but most of the text is of a later date and is unreliable. The king did grant the fortress at Artés to the bishop, as well as one third of public revenue in the county. By 911, when the will of Count Wifred II granted a third of the profits of the mints in Osona to the bishop, the latter had already replaced the viscount as the most powerful person in the county. During the reign of Louis IV (936–54), the bishop of Vic received royal confirmation of his monetary right. In 957, without any authority to do so, the bishop began keeping back all the profits of the mints for the church. Throughout the 10th century the counts of Osona sought to re-settle the west of the county and fortify the frontier. To this end they granted many frontier castles to the bishop to hold.

Minor basilicas
 Basilica of Santa Maria, Igualada
 Basilica of Santa Maria de la Seu, Manresa

Bishops

Medieval period
886–899 Gotmar, first bishop of the restored diocese
899–914 Idalguer
914–947 Jordi
948–957 Guadamir
957–971 Ató
972–993 Frujà
993–1010 Arnulf
1010–1017 Borrell
1017–1046 Oliba
1046–1076 Guillem de Balsareny
1076–1099 Berenguer Seniofred de Lluçà
1099–1101 Guillem Berenguer
1102–1109 Arnau de Malla
1109–1146 Ramon Gaufré
1147–1185 Pere de Redorta
1185–1194 Ramon Xetmar de Castellterçol
1195–1233 Guillem de Taverte
...
1424–1445 Jordi d'Ornós

Modern period
 Bishop Romà Casanova Casanova (since 2003.06.13)
 Bishop Josep Maria Guix Ferreres (1983.06.20 – 2003.06.13)
 Bishop Ramon Masnou i Boixeda (1955.12.02 – 1983.06.20)
 Bishop Joan Perelló i Pou, M.S.C. (1927.06.20 – 1955.07.27)
 Patriarch Francesc Muñoz i Izquierdo (1916.05.05 – 1925.12.14)
 Bishop Josep Torras i Bages (1899.06.19 – 1916.02.07)
 Bishop Josep Morgades i Gili (1882.03.27 – 1899.06.19)
 Bishop Pere Colomer i Mestres (1875.09.17 – 1881.08.30)
 Bishop Antoni Lluís Jordà i Soler (1866.01.08 – 1872.06.22)
 Bishop Joan-Josep Castanyer i Ribas (1857.12.21 – 1865.05.18)
 Bishop Antoni Palau i Térmens (1853.12.22 – 1857.09.25)
 Bishop Llucià Casadevall i Duran (1848.07.03 – 1852.03.10)
 Bishop Pau Jesús Corcuera i Caserta (1824.10.19 – 1835.07.03)
 Bishop Ramon Strauch i Vidal, O.F.M. (1816.09.23 – 1823.04.16)
 Bishop Francesc de Veyan i Mola (1783.12.15 – 1815.12.30)
 Bishop Antoni Manuel de Hartalejo López, O. de M. (1777.02.17 – 1782.06.18)
 Bishop Bartolomé Sarmentero, O.F.M. (1752.07.17 – 1775.12.06)
 Bishop Manuel Muñoz Guil (1744.07.13 – 1750.09.30)
 Bishop Ramon de Marimon i de Corbera-Santcliment (1720.12.16 – 1744.01.16)
 Bishop Manuel de Santjust Pagès (1710.02.19 – 1720.06.18)
 Bishop Antoni Pascual (1684–1704)
 Bishop Jaume Mas (1674–1684)
 Bishop Jaume de Copons i de Tamarit (1665–1674)
 Bishop Brauli Sunyer (1663–1664)
 Bishop Francesc Crespí de Valldaura i Brizuela (1656–1662)
 Bishop Ramon de Senmenat i Lanuza (1640.01.20 – 1655.10.25)
 Bishop Gaspar Gil i Miravete de Blancas (1634.11.20 – 1638.08.25)
 Bishop Pere de Magarola i Fontanet (1627.03.22 – 1634.03.22)
 Bishop Andrés de San Jerónimo, O.S.H. (1614.08.27 – 1625.09.28)
 Bishop Antoni Gallart i de Treginer (1612.03.19 – 1613.12.16)
 Bishop Onofre de Reard (1608.03.03 – 1611.12.19)
 Bishop Francesc Robuster i Sala (1598.05.05 – 1607.04.27)
 Bishop Joan Vila (1597.02.27 – 1597.09.24)
 Bishop Pere Jaime (1587.08.07 – 1597.03.10)
 Bishop Joan Baptista de Cardona (1584.07.04 – 1587.03.18)
 Bishop Pere d'Aragó (1577.01.14 – 1584.05.04)
 Bishop Bernat de Jossa i de Cardona, O.S.B. (1574.10.15 – 1575.09.21)
 Bishop Benet de Tocco, O.S.B. (1564.11.06 – 1572.09.05)
 Bishop Braulio Sunyer (1563.01.05 – 1567)
 Archbishop Acisclo Moya de Contreras (1554.07.06 – 1564.01.27)
 Bishop Joan de Tormo (1510.12.09 – 1553.01.01)
 Bishop Joan d'Enguera, O.P. (1505.12.19 – 1510.12.09)

Churches
 
Sant Jaume de Vallverd

References

Notes

Sources

External links
GCatholic.org
Catholic Hierarchy
Diocese website 
Bishops of Vic Diocese website 

Roman Catholic dioceses in Catalonia
Roman Catholic dioceses in Spain
Dioceses established in the 5th century

ca:Llista de bisbes de Vic